The 2022 Pac-12 Conference men's soccer season is the 23rd season of men's varsity soccer sponsored by the Pac-12 Conference. Part of the 2022 NCAA Division I men's soccer season, the Pac-12 will begin play in August 2022 and conclude in November 2022. 

Oregon State are the defending Pac-12 champions.

Teams

Stadiums and Locations

Preseason

Recruiting classes

Preseason Coaches polls
The preseason polls will be released on August 16, 2022. Oregon State and Washington were voted to be co-champions. Below are the results of the media poll with total points received next to each school and first-place votes in parentheses.

Preseason awards

All−American teams

Preseason All Pac-12

First Team

Second Team

All Pac–12 Honorable Mention (received votes from four or more members of the media): 
California: 
Oregon State:
San Diego State:
Stanford:
UCLA:
Washington:

Preseason exhibitions

Head coaches

Coaching changes
There was one coaching change ahead of the 2022 season. California head coach, Kevin Grimes, retired at the end of the 2021 season. Grimes was replaced by Leonard Griffin, who had previously coached Grand Canyon University.

Coaches
Note: All stats current through the completion of the 2021 season

Regular season 

All times Pacific time.

Conference results 
Each team plays every other conference team twice; once home and once away.

Positions by round

Schedule

Week 1 (Aug 22–28)

Week 2 (Aug 29–Sep 4)

Week 3 (Sep 5–11)

Week 4 (Sep 12–18)

Week 5 (Sep 19–25)

Week 6 (Sep 26–Oct 2)

Week 7 (Oct 3–9)

Week 8 (Oct 10–16)

Week 9 (Oct 17–23)

Week 10 (Oct 24–30)

Week 11 (Oct 31–Nov 6)

Week 12 (Nov 7–13)

Postseason

NCAA Tournament 

The Pac-12 had four teams receive a bid to the 2022 NCAA Tournament, three of the teams were seeded.

Rankings

National rankings

Regional rankings - USC Far West Region 

The United Soccer Coaches' Far West region ranks teams across the Pac-12, Big West, and WAC.

Awards and honors

Player of the week honors
Following each week's games, Pac-12 conference officials select the player of the week.

Postseason honors

Conference honors

National honors

MLS SuperDraft

Draft picks

Homegrown contracts

Notes

References

External links 
 Pac-12 Men's Soccer

 
2022 NCAA Division I men's soccer season